Navruzbek Olimov (born 21 March 1992) is an Uzbekistani footballer who currently plays for Pakhtakor as a striker.

Career
In 2015, he moved to Pakhtakor after completing two season playing for Qizilqum Zarafshon.

International career
Olimov played his debut match for senior national team on 27 May 2014 against Oman (0–1), where he came in as a substitute for Ivan Nagaev in the 67th minute.

Career statistics

International goal
Scores and results list Uzbekistan's goal tally first.

References

External links
 
 

1992 births
Living people
Uzbekistani footballers
Uzbekistan international footballers
Association football forwards
Footballers at the 2014 Asian Games
Asian Games competitors for Uzbekistan